The 2015–16 Jacksonville Dolphins men's basketball team represented Jacksonville University during the 2015–16 NCAA Division I men's basketball season. The Dolphins were members of the Atlantic Sun Conference (A-Sun). They were led by second year head coach Tony Jasick and played their home games at Swisher Gymnasium on the University's Jacksonville, Florida campus. They finished the season 16–16, 8–6 in A-Sun play to finish in a three way tie for second place. They lost in the quarterfinals of the A-Sun tournament to Lipscomb.

Roster

Schedule

 
|-
!colspan=9 style="background:#004D40; color:#FFFFFF;"| Non-conference regular season

|-
!colspan=9 style="background:#004D40; color:#FFFFFF;"| Atlantic Sun Conference regular season

|-
!colspan=9 style="background:#004D40; color:#FFFFFF;"| Atlantic Sun tournament

References

Jacksonville Dolphins men's basketball seasons
Jacksonville